Albert Wilson (28 January 1915 – 1998) was an English professional footballer who played as a winger.

References

1915 births
1998 deaths
People from Rotherham
English footballers
Association football wingers
Rotherham YMCA F.C. players
Rawmarsh Welfare F.C. players
Stafford Rangers F.C. players
Derby County F.C. players
Mansfield Town F.C. players
Crystal Palace F.C. players
Rotherham United F.C. players
Grimsby Town F.C. players
Boston United F.C. players
Scunthorpe United F.C. players
English Football League players
English football managers
Rotherham United F.C. managers
English Football League managers